Paul Eltzbacher (18 February 1868 – 25 October 1928) was a Jewish German law professor. Eltzbacher was born in Cologne. From 1890 to 1895, he was a junior lawyer for the regional court districts of Cologne and Frankfurt, with a year off in 1891–1892 for military service. By 1899, he had attained his doctorate and set about writing a treatise upon the subject of anarchism, for which he was made a professor in 1906. After this point, he limited his opinions to the area of civil rights with respect to commercial law. However, it is for his earlier writings upon the subject of anarchism that he is known today.

After World War I, Eltzbacher was an adherent to Bolshevism. He suggested in his work Der Bolschewismus und die deutsche Zukunft (1919) that Germany's interests would be best served by adopting a Bolshevik regime. As a member of the Reichstag, Eltzbacher argued in April 1919 for complete state ownership without compensation. The Deutsche Tageszeitung newspaper dubbed Eltzbacher's new theory as "National Bolshevism".

Eltzbacher was a brother of the author J. Ellis Barker, who emigrated to Britain and gained fame and influence as one of the most active haters of his German homeland. He died in Berlin, aged 60.

Books 
 The Great Anarchists: Ideas and Teachings of Seven Major Thinkers, .
 Anarchism, .
 Anarkhizm, (German) .

External links 
 
 

1868 births
1928 deaths
Jurists from Cologne
19th-century German Jews
German communists
German monarchists
National Bolsheviks